Slightly Stoopid is an American band based in the Ocean Beach neighborhood of San Diego, California, who describe their music as "a fusion of folk, rock, reggae and blues with hip-hop, funk, metal and punk." As a band, they have released thirteen albums (four live), with their ninth studio album entitled Everyday Life, Everyday People on July 13, 2018. The band was originally signed by Bradley Nowell from the band Sublime to his label Skunk Records while still in high school.

History

Founding, early releases (1994–2007)
In 1994, Slightly Stoopid was formed in Ocean Beach, California by Miles Doughty and Kyle McDonald, both childhood friends, as well as high school friend and drummer Adam Bausch. Sublime front man Bradley Nowell was staying with Doughty’s nurse mother and doctor boyfriend in their drug rehabilitation program when he stumbled across the band. After waking up one morning, he overheard the band practicing in the garage and was impressed, asking them to perform in Long Beach, California at the Foot Hill Tavern. Nowell shortly after signed them to his label Skunk Records while the members were still attending high school. In 1996 the band released their first studio album, the punk-tinged Slightly $toopid (featuring a guest appearance by Nowell on the song "Prophet" – later covered by Sublime and released on their box set, Everything Under the Sun) and 1998's surf-inspired The Longest Barrel Ride.

The group self-released 2001's Acoustic Roots: Live & Direct (a 40-minute acoustic set, captured live at San Diego's 91X radio station) – the first for their own label, Stoopid Records, before issuing 2003's Everything You Need on Surfdog Records (a musical departure for the band, that sold more than 185,000 copies).

Adam Bausch left the band shortly after recording and releasing The Longest Barrel Ride. Slightly Stoopid had fourteen drummers between Adam Bausch and their current drummer, Ryan 'RyMo' Moran. These drummers include: Kelly Vargas (of Sublime / Dissension), Dan Lancelot, Damion Ramirez (of Capitol Eye / Long Beach Shortbus), and Paul Vrieling (who is pictured in the background on the cover of the Everything You Need album).

After solidifying a new line-up with first the removal of Bausch, due to personal differences, then with the additions of Ryan 'RyMo' Moran (drums), as well as Oguer 'OG' Ocon (congas, percussion, harp, vocals), C-Money (trumpet, keyboard) and Dela (saxophone) from John Brown's Body, the band began to mix even more different musical styles on 2005's Closer to the Sun. The album featured collaborations with well-known reggae names such as Barrington Levy and Scientist. Closer to the Sun impressively debuted in the Billboard Top 200 and sold nearly 25,000 copies in its first two months of release.

A year later, Slightly Stoopid issued their first-ever electric live album, Winter Tour '05-'06 Live CD/DVD, as well as their first-ever DVD, Live in San Diego, while 2007 saw the release of the group's fifth studio effort, Chronchitis, which debuted at #55 on the Billboard 200, and #2 on the Independent Albums charts.

Live touring

The group has toured frequently since its inception, including appearances at arts festivals such as Coachella, Harmony, Lollapalooza, Austin City Limits, and New Orleans Jazz Fest. Additionally, the group has played sold-out shows in Australia, Japan, Guam, Portugal, Denmark, the UK, Germany, the Netherlands, and the Dominican Republic. "Without [the fans], we'd just be playing at the bar", admits Kyle. "They make it worth our while – when we go out and people are having that good of a time, the energy goes back and forth. Just a good time – we rely on each other's energy."

Slightly Stoopid has played with the Dave Matthews Band, Damian "Jr. Gong" Marley (and the Marley Brothers), Sublime, the Roots, The Expendables, Snoop Dogg, G. Love & Special Sauce, Ozomatli, Toots and the Maytals, Helva, and Pennywise, among others, as well as their first-ever sole headlining tour of amphitheaters in 2008, joined by their friends Pepper and Sly & Robbie featuring Cherine Anderson.

The band teamed up with Snoop Dogg in 2009 for the co-headlining "Blazed & Confused Tour" across North America.

Stoopid Records, live albums (2008–2011)
In 2008, the band issued their first-ever 'odds and ends' collection, Slightly Not Stoned Enough to Eat Breakfast Yet Stoopid – the group's newest release for their growing label, Stoopid Records (which also featured releases by other groups, including the label's first signed act, The Expendables from Santa Cruz, California). Included on Slightly Not Stoned Enough to Eat Breakfast Yet Stoopid are outtakes from both the Closer to the Sun (including tracks that were previously issued as a limited edition bonus CD) and Chronchitis sessions, as well as a bevy of new material recorded at the famed Circle House Studios in Miami, Florida, and such cover tunes as UB40's "I Would Do For You" and the traditional "I Know You Rider" (most notably covered by The Grateful Dead). Also making their first appearance on a Slightly Stoopid studio album are newly recorded renditions of the long-time live standards "False Rhythms" and "Sinsemilla".

On September 13, 2011, the band was invited by the Grateful Dead's Bob Weir to his state-of-the-art TRI Studios for a live webcast and in-studio performance. Utilizing the technology of the studio's Constellation sound system, Slightly Stoopid had the privilege of inviting some of their closest friends and family members down to record Live at Roberto's TRI Studios, performing alongside Weir as well as Karl Denson, Don Carlos, Ivan Neville, Ian Neville, and host Tommy Chong.

Top of the World and Meanwhile...Back At The Lab (2012–Present)

The band's seventh studio album, Top of the World, was released on August 14, 2012. The seven-piece band continues to explore a variety of styles on Top of the World, with help from some of their biggest influences and heroes including: reggae legends Barrington Levy and Don Carlos of Black Uhuru; "unofficial 8th member" Karl Denson of Greyboy Allstars; longtime band friend and touring partner G. Love; Fishbone frontman Angelo Moore; ex-Jurassic 5 emcee extraordinaire Chali 2na; Dumpstaphunk's Ian Neville; and hit-making singer/songwriter Angela Hunte. The album entered the Billboard 200 at a career high #13, as well as on Billboard Independent Albums chart at #3. Top of the World also debuted on Billboard Rock Albums and Alternative Albums charts with a final position of #4.

Following the album release, the band performed on the "Red Bull Sound Space at KROQ"  on August 23, followed by appearances on tastemaker indie music website Daytrotter and SiriusXM. The group also appeared on Jimmy Kimmel Live! on September 12 to play their current single, "Top of the World."

Slightly Stoopid continued to tour extensively, playing 38 dates in 2014 in cities all across the US. Their summer 2014 tour featured G. Love and also Bob Marley's son, Stephen Marley.

On April 20, 2015, Slightly Stoopid announced via their social media pages and website that they intended to release a new album, entitled Meanwhile...Back At The Lab. The album was released on June 30, 2015. The album's track list was subsequently published on iTunes.

The band's eighth album, Everyday Life, Everyday People, released on July 13, 2018. It topped the Billboard Reggae Albums chart. The album features special guests, Italian reggae artist, Alborosie, UB40's Ali Campbell, Chali 2na, Don Carlos (on two tracks), G.Love, and Yellowman.

Musical influences
The group is noted for their eclectic mix of rock, reggae, blues, hip-hop, metal and funk in their works. When the group first started out, they drew numerous influences from the likes of punk rock groups such as Sublime, Operation Ivy, and Rancid. Slightly Stoopid's self-titled album was released months after Brad Nowell's death in 1996 under Skunk Records. Their reggae influences stem from artists such as Yellowman, Don Carlos and Buju Banton.

The band has also experimented with hip-hop on their more recent albums.  The song "The Otherside" off the album Chronchitis features the late rapper Guru. They note hip hop influences NWA and Eazy-E, Wu-Tang Clan, and Gang Starr. 
Miles Doughty's vocal style in particular references reggae legends Eek a Mouse, Pinchers, and Tenor Saw quite often.

Lineup

Current band members
Miles Doughty – Lead Vocals, Guitar, Bass (1994–Present)
Kyle McDonald – Lead Vocals, Bass, Guitar (1994–Present)
Ryan Moran ("RyMo") – Drums (2000–Present)
Oguer "OG" Ocon – Congas, Percussion, Harp, Backing Vocals (2003–Present)
Daniel "DeLa" Delacruz – Saxophone (2006–Present)
Andy Geib – Trombone (2013–Present)
Paul Wolstencroft – Keyboards (2013–Present)

Guest members
Karl Denson – saxophone (guest on Top of the World album) (2012)
Don Carlos
Rashawn Ross
Chali 2na (Jurassic Five)

Past band members
Adam Bausch – Drums (1994–2000)
Chris "C-Money" Welter – Trumpet (2006–2013)

Discography

Studio albums

Live albums/DVDs
2004: Acoustic Roots: Live & Direct
2006: Winter Tour '05-'06 Live CD/DVD
2006: Live in San Diego DVD
2013: Slightly Stoopid & Friends: Live at Roberto's TRI Studios

EPs
Slightly Not Stoned Enough To Eat Breakfast Yet Stoopid EP (2008)

Singles

Other certified songs

Songs
Singles that did not chart/top tracks off each album

Summer tours

Other projects
In August 2021, Slightly Stoopid collaborated with Stay Up Movement (SUM), a company that makes eco-friendly sunglasses. They have a pair of exclusive limited-edition polarized shades used and approved by the band (one in matte black with red + orange tinted lenses, and one in a tortoise shell frame).

After a decades-long relationship with Black Flys Sunglasses, in 2022, Slightly Stoopid teamed up with owner Moe Sim on his company's "Artist Collaborations" line. One of their limited edition sunglasses is called a "Stoopid Fly" which is decked out in the band's own branding.

In the Summer of 2022, the band collaborated with Torrance, California's Buzzrock Brewing Co. with the "Stoopid Tangie Summer Haze", a fruity lager that's brewed with "stoopid" fruits, including tangerine.

Gallery

References

External links

SlightlyStoopid.com
Slightly Stoopid on Facebook
Slightly Stoopid on Twitter

Media
Slightly Stoopid on YouTube
Slightly Stoopid collection at the Internet Archive's live music archive
Slightly Stoopid at purevolume.com
https://stoopidheads.com/ online band almanac

Further reading
Kyle and Rymo answer the Fans Questions, 2007
Skratch Magazine interview
TheWaster.com Interview

Rock music groups from California
Reggae rock groups
Reggae fusion groups
Musical groups from San Diego
Ocean Beach, San Diego
Cannabis music
American reggae musical groups